Suspended Alibi is a 1957 black and white British crime film directed by Alfred Shaughnessy and starring Patrick Holt, Honor Blackman and Lloyd Lamble. The film was produced by Robert Dunbar for Act Films Ltd. It was reissued in the United States as Suspected Alibi.

Plot
Paul Pearson's alibi for seeing his mistress Diana is with his friend, but when this friend is found murdered, Pearson is arrested for the crime, condemned by his own alibi and sentenced to hang. Fortunately, his story is believed by Sandy Thorpe, a diligent crime reporter, who helps to fight Pearson's case.

Cast
 Patrick Holt as Paul Pearson
 Honor Blackman as Lynn Pearson
 Valentine Dyall as Inspector Kayes
 Naomi Chance as Diana
 Lloyd Lamble as Waller
 Andrew Keir as Sandy Thorpe
 Frederick Piper as Mr. Beamster
 Viola Lyel as Mrs. Beamster
 Bryan Coleman as Bill Forrest
 Wally Patch as Porter
 Madoline Thomas as Granny
 Edgar Wreford as Prison Chaplain
 Brown Derby as Sergeant Roberts

Critical reception
The Stop Button wrote, "the movie opens with a neat trick – Holt’s creeping through the opening credits with a gun drawn only for a curtain to pull and reveal he’s playing cowboy and Indian with his son (in England?) – and I hope a better film stole it because it’s a reasonably deft move. But as far as film noir goes – bad film noir – the incompetent direction disqualifies Suspended Alibi. Even from the label"; while Britmovie called the film an "efficient thriller...undemanding yet fanciful b-movie crime drama crisply directed by Alfred Shaughnessy"; and TV Guide noted "an okay crime drama that passes the time pleasantly."

Film historians Steve Chibnall and Brian McFarlane praise it as "much faster, more frantically and densely plotted than most 'B' movies. The familiar race-against-the-clock to save the condemned man produces some well-sustained tension, and, if the ending is never in serious doubt, Shaughnessy's brisk storytelling and Robert Hill's editing sustain interest in the crowded narrative."

References

External links
 

1957 films
1957 crime drama films
British crime drama films
1950s English-language films
1950s British films